Antonio Ballatore is a television personality and designer who was the winner of the fourth season of the reality show HGTV Design Star.

Television career

HGTV Design Star
In 2009, Ballatore was one of eleven contestants on season four of the HGTV reality competition Design Star. He was named the winner of the competition by judges Vern Yip, Genevieve Gorder, and Candice Olson. As a result of this, he was given his own show, The Antonio Treatment.

References

External links
 

Living people
Year of birth missing (living people)
American interior designers
Participants in American reality television series
Reality show winners